Chur is a settlement in Yakshur-Bodyinsky District of the Udmurt Republic, Russia.

Rural localities in Udmurtia